The Marine Unit, formerly the Australian Customs Service National Marine Unit, is a division of the Australian Border Force which acts as a Coast Guard in guarding Australia's coast. The Marine Unit focuses on surveillance and response activities within the Australian Economic Exclusion Zone (EEZ), and the operation and training of ships and crews to do so.

Operations

The CMU and the Border Protection Division (formerly known as Coastwatch) make up the Customs contribution to Maritime Border Command, a joint command with the Australian Defence Force and incorporating assets from the Australian Fisheries Management Authority, the Australian Quarantine and Inspection Service, and state-level agencies. Maritime Border Command is responsible for protecting Australia's maritime areas, offshore assets, and external territories from threats, including the exploitation of natural resources, people smuggling, importation or exportation of drugs and other illegal items, piracy, and terrorism.

Facilities
Australian Border Force maintains a permanent base of operations for the Marine Unit at the Port Darwin East Arm Wharf.

Ships

Ships operated by the CMU were referred to as Australian Customs Vessels (ACVs) until the creation of the Australian Border Force in 2015 when the prefix of vessels operated by the CMU was changed to Australian Border Force Cutter (ABFC).

Current Ships
ABFC Thaiyak is a unique  vessel delivered in June 2014  intended to replace the ACV Ashmore Guardian for use around the Ashmore and Cartier Islands. In addition, charter arrangements give Customs access to an additional twenty vessels of various sizes and types; these are called on when required to transport apprehended foreign fishermen and illegal entrants, or tow captured vessels.

Small Boats

In 2017 Australian Border Force signed contracts to acquire 13 new harbour and costal patrol boats. These vessels are stationed around the country and are used for a variety of operations including costal patrol, surveillance and drug interdiction.

Future Ships
The Royal Australian Navy has procured 6 Evolved Cape-class patrol vessels to act as a stopgap replacement for the Armidale-class patrol boat as they await the completion of the Arafura-class of patrol vessels. It remains unclear if these Evolved Cape-class patrol vessels will be transferred to the Australian Border Force once all Arafura-class vessels have been commissioned into RAN service.

The Defence Strategic Review (DSR) due in 2023 is reportedly considering removing the Arafura-class from Royal Australian Navy service and transferring them to the Australian Border Force Marine Unit, this is being considered as the Arafura class lacks the capabilities required in high-end warfighting. Under that plan, the RAN would instead acquire a fleet of corvettes
.

Former Ships

6 s. 4 Bay-class patrol boats have been gifted to the Sri Lankan Navy and Malaysian Maritime Enforcement Agency.
ACV Triton
ACV Ashmore Guardian
MV Oceanic Viking

References

External links
 ABF Maritime Border Command Patrol vessels

 
Customs services